Marina Querini (1757–1839) was a Venetian salon-holder.

Biography
She was the daughter of Pietro Antonio Querini de San Severo and Matilde da Ponte and married in 1777 to count Pietro Giovanni Benzon. She hosted a famous literary salon in Venice. Among her guests were Lord Byron, Thomas Moore, Antonio Canova, Ippolito Pindemonte, Vincenzo drake and Cesare Arici. She was known for her live life and the muse for Anton Maria Lamberti.

Places
She owned a palazzo in Venice now known as Palazzo Querini Benzon. Today the palace is considered a UNESCO heritage site.

Sources

 Michela Brugnera, Gianfranco Siega, Donne Venete di Treviso, Padova e Venezia tra storia e leggenda, Edritrice Manunzio, 2010, pp. 139–142, .

1757 births
1839 deaths
Republic of Venice entertainers
Italian salon-holders
18th-century Venetian people
19th-century Italian people
18th-century Venetian women
19th-century Italian women